Robert Juday (June 24, 1900 – January 30, 1988) was an American athlete. He competed in the men's high jump at the 1924 Summer Olympics.

References

External links
 

1900 births
1988 deaths
Athletes (track and field) at the 1924 Summer Olympics
American male high jumpers
Olympic track and field athletes of the United States
Place of birth missing